Mangifera campnospermoides is a species of plant in the family Anacardiaceae. It is a tree endemic to Kalimantan in Indonesia. It is a critically endangered species threatened by habitat loss.

References

campnospermoides
Endemic flora of Borneo
Trees of Borneo
Flora of Kalimantan
Critically endangered plants
Taxonomy articles created by Polbot
Taxa named by André Joseph Guillaume Henri Kostermans